Oliver Tärnström (born August 30, 2002) is a Swedish ice hockey centre who plays for Rögle BK J20 in the J20 Nationell league. Tärnström made his SHL debut for Rögle BK during the 2021–22 SHL season.  He was drafted by the New York Rangers of the NHL in the third round of the 2020 NHL Entry Draft with the 92nd overall pick in the draft.

His father, Dick Tärnström was an ice hockey defenceman for AIK in the SHL as well as several NHL teams.

References

External links
 

2002 births
Living people
AIK IF players
New York Rangers draft picks
Rögle BK players
Ice hockey people from Stockholm
Swedish ice hockey centres
Tingsryds AIF players